Al-Nu'mān ibn ʿAbd al-ʿAzīz ibn Shuʿayb ibn ʿUmar al-Qurṭubī, known by the Byzantines as Anemas, was the son of the last Emir of Crete, Abd al-Aziz ibn Shu'ayb. Following the Siege of Chandax and the reconquest of Crete by the Byzantines, Anemas and his father were taken as prisoners to Constantinople and displayed during the triumph of the conqueror and future emperor Nikephoros II Phokas.

Upon settling in Constantinople, Anemas converted to Christianity and joined the Byzantine army as a member of the imperial bodyguard.

When the emperor John I Tzimiskes campaigned against the Kievan Rus in 971, Anemas joined the expedition and went on to fight in a number of engagements during the Siege of Dorostolon. According to Leo the Deacon, during a sally of the besieged Rus, Anemas personally engaged and killed their second-in-command, Ikmor. On the next day (Leo gives it as Friday the 24th of July, but the 24th was a Monday) the Rus launched a determined all-out attack around sunset, hoping to break through. Anemas charged the Rus leader, Sviatoslav, and struck him on the neck, throwing him off his horse; his armour however saved Sviatoslav, and the Rus quickly came to his aid and attacked Anemas. The latter was able to kill several, but in the end was killed himself. The Rus then charged with renewed confidence, but were beaten back with heavy casualties, forcing Sviatoslav to capitulate and sign a treaty with Tzimiskes.

It is possible that the Anemas family that appears in the Byzantine aristocracy in the 11th–12th centuries were his descendants.

References

Sources 
 
 
 

971 deaths
10th-century Arabs
10th-century Byzantine people
Byzantine people of Arab descent
Converts to Christianity from Islam
Byzantines killed in battle
Emirate of Crete
Year of birth unknown